is a JR West Kabe Line station located in Kabe-Minami, Asaminami-ku, Hiroshima, Hiroshima Prefecture, Japan.

Station layout
Nakashima Station features one side platform handling one bidirectional track. It has a small waiting room with two bench seats. There is a unisex pit toilet next to the waiting room. The platform is unmanned, but features an automated ticket machine. The ticket gate accepts ICOCA passes as well as traditional tickets. Tickets for Nakashima are discarded in a box hanging next to the automated ticket machine. Improvements to raise the height and pitch of the platform and make improvements to the wheelchair ramp leading to the platform were completed in November 2012. An area for parking bicycles and two-wheeled vehicles is located on the far side of the station.

Platforms

History
1911-06-12: Nakashima Station opens
1936-09-01: The station is renamed Aki-Nakashima Station
1943-10-01: Station operations suspended
1956-10-01: Station reopens and is renamed Nakashima Station
1987-04-01: Japanese National Railways is privatized, and Nakashima Station becomes a JR West station

Surrounding area
Japan National Route 54
Hiroshima Municipal Kabe Minami Elementary School
Hiroshima Bunkyo Women's University
Nakashima Station Entrance Bus Station
Kabe Driving School
Kabe Public Employment Office
Ōta River
JR West Geibi Line Shimofukawa Station is located 1.5 km southwest

Kabe Line
Hiroshima City Network
Stations of West Japan Railway Company in Hiroshima city
Railway stations in Japan opened in 1911
Railway stations closed in 1943
Railway stations in Japan opened in 1956